The Korean Music Awards is an annual South Korean music awards show that honors both mainstream and underground musical artists from a variety of genres. Unlike other major South Korean music awards, which largely rely on record sales to determine winners, the Korean Music Awards distributes awards based on the recommendations of a panel of judges consisting of music critics, radio show producers, academics, and other professionals within the industry. The first ceremony was held in 2004, and is regarded as one of the most prestigious music awards in the country.

Ceremonies

Categories
The event currently has approximately 20 categories, including the Musician of the Year, Album of the Year, Song of the Year,  Rookie of the Year, and genre awards in pop, rock, modern rock, metal & hardcore, folk, dance & electronic, hip hop, R&B & soul, and jazz & crossover music.

Musician of the Year (Grand Prize) 

Note: The award for Musician of the Year was divided into Male, Female and Group awards from 2004 to 2007.

Album of the Year (Grand Prize)

Song of the Year (Grand Prize)

Rookie of the Year

Genre Awards

Best Pop Album

Best Pop Song

Best K-Pop Album

Best K-Pop Song

Best Rock Album

Best Rock Song

Best Modern Rock Album

Best Modern Rock Song

Best Metal & Hardcore Album

Best Folk Album

Best Folk Song

Best Dance & Electronic Album

Best Dance & Electronic Song

Best Rap & Hip Hop Album

Best Rap & Hip Hop Song

Best R&B & Soul Album

Best R&B & Soul Song

Best Jazz & Crossover Album

Best Jazz & Crossover Song

Best Jazz & Crossover Performance

Best Movie/TV Album Soundtrack

Popularity Awards

Group Musician of the Year Netizen Vote

Female Musician of the Year Netizen Vote

Male Musician of the Year Netizen Vote

Rock Musician of the Year Netizen Vote

Modern Rock Musician of the Year Netizen Vote

Hip Hop Musician of the Year Netizen Vote

Pop Musician of the Year Netizen Vote

Dance & Electronic Musician of the Year Netizen Vote

R&B & Soul Musician of the Year Netizen Vote

Jazz & Crossover Musician of the Year Netizen Vote

Special awards

Committee Choice Special Award

Achievement Award

Record Label of the Year

Records

Most awarded overall 
Includes both Competitive Awards as well as Popularity & Special Awards

Most grand prizes 
Musician of the Year, Album of the Year & Song of the Year

General references 
 2021 winners: Ham, Nayan (2021-02-28). "". Sports Dong-A. (in Korean). Retrieved 2021-02-28
 2019 winners: Kim, Su-jeong (2019-02-27). "BTS, 한국대중음악상 '올해의 음악인' 수상… "상 의미 잘 안다". No Cut News. (in Korean). Retrieved 2018-02-27
2018 winners: Jang Jin-ri (2018-02-28). "'대중음악상' 방탄소년단, 올해의 음악인…혁오·강태구 '3관왕'". Osen. (in Korean). Retrieved 2018-02-28.
 2017 winners: Park, Su-jeong (2017-02-28). "'한국대중음악상' 박재범·볼빨간·조동진, 올해를 빛낸 음악인(종합)". The Korea Herald (in Korean). Retrieved 2018-02-25.
 2016 winners: Jeong Yu-jin (2016-02-29). "빅뱅3관왕·이센스2관왕·혁오2관왕(종합) [13th 한국대중음악상]". Osen (in Korean). Retrieved 2018-02-25.
 2015 winners: Kwon, Seok-jeong (2015-02-27). "10현장, 한국대중음악상이 증명한 것들". Ten Asia (in Korean). Retrieved 2018-02-25.
 2014 winners: Yang Eun-ha (2014-02-28). "윤영배, 제11회 한국대중음악상 음반상 3관왕(종합)". News1 Korea (in Korean). Retrieved 2018-02-25.
 2013 winners: Seo Jeong-min (2013-02-28). "버터플라이·싸이 ‘화려한 귀환’…인디·비주류 음악 대중속으로". The Hankyoreh (in Korean). Retrieved 2018-02-25.
 2012 winners: Seo Jeong-min (2012-02-29). "장기하와 얼굴들 4관왕 ‘뭘 그렇게 놀래?’". The Hankyoreh (in Korean). Retrieved 2018-02-25.

References

External links
 Korean Music Awards official website 

South Korean music awards
Annual events in South Korea